Huber Motor Sales Building, also known as Kenny Kent Body Shop, is a historic commercial building located in downtown Evansville, Indiana. It was designed by the architecture firm Shopbell & Company and built in 1916.  It is a two-story, brick building.

It was listed on the National Register of Historic Places in 1984.

References

Commercial buildings on the National Register of Historic Places in Indiana
Commercial buildings completed in 1916
Buildings and structures in Evansville, Indiana
National Register of Historic Places in Evansville, Indiana